Battarreoides ( Battarraeoides) is a fungal genus in the family Agaricaceae. It is a monotypic genus, containing the single species Battarreoides diguetii, found in desert regions of North America. The fungus was originally named Battarreoides potosinus by Teófilo Herrera Suárez in 1951.

See also
 List of Agaricales genera
 List of Agaricaceae genera

References

Agaricaceae
Fungi of North America
Monotypic Agaricales genera